Government Sri Ranbir Model Higher Secondary School named after founder Maharaja Ranbir Singh, commonly known as SRML Jammu and Ranbir School, is a government boys higher secondary school in Jammu district of Indian union territory of Jammu and Kashmir. It is first high school of Jammu region which was established by Maharaja Ranbir Singh in the late 19th century to promote higher education. The school is affiliated with Jammu and Kashmir Board of School Education.

History 
Dogra Ruler Maharaja Ranbir Singh founded the institute in 1872 and Maharaja Partap Singh completed construction in 1884. At that time, it had the privilege to be the first school of its kind in the state.

The building between Tennis Hall and Canteen block was used as rasala for many years. The office of the school at present was used by Dogra Rulers to deliver justice to the public and the sangeet hall was used for conference and musical programs, the terrace of sangeet hall was used by queens to enjoy artist's performances. Before independence, the first information department worked from the commerce block for 10 years, Radio Kashmir Jammu aired its programs for 15 years from the tennis hall. The army used a block as its base camp for seven years. Another building was used as a stable for the horses of the Maharaja.

Name history
Maharaja Ranbir Singh founded the institute in 1872, initially called the Ranbir Pathshala. In 1905, it was named as Jammu Collegiate School. Later in 1965, it was renamed as Government Sri Ranbir Multi-Lateral Higher Secondary School. In 2015, it was renamed as Government Sri Ranbir Model Higher Secondary School. That is why it is commonly known as SRML Model Higher Secondary School, a combination of its earlier and current name.

Administration and Campus
The school has a campus of 5.1 acre. Around 2000 students study in school with 140 teaching and non-teaching faculty. Ms Anjali Gupta is current principal of school. The school has old heritage building with 73 rooms, a library, laboratories, smart classes and an Information Communication Technology (ICT) lab. The campus also features an inhouse botanical garden. The school is surrounded by Parade ground and Women College Parade on one side and secretariat road on other. Rani Park commonly known as Zanana Park is just some footstep far from school.

Academics
Till 2015, the school has only one academic section for higher studies. But in 2015, it has given the status of Heritage Model School after which it has been divided into three academics sections:

Nursery education
There is a nursery school for children age between 3-6 years with a capacity of 100 students for the weaker sections of the society. This includes children from Schedule Caste, Schedule Tribe and Other Backward Classes.

Middle education
A middle school for students between 1st-8th class and age between 6-14 years with a capacity of 100 students also there. Not many students prefer it and so it has never filled it maximum capacity.

Higher education
The school is famous for its higher education. Around 96% of students came here for higher education. For class 9th and 10th there are two sections with five common and one optional subject. For class 11th and 12th there are science, commerce and arts stream. There is also a golden branch system for class 11th and 12th students according to which students with more than 80% marks get top faculty of school.

Heritage status
From a long time, school administration has a demand to declare it as heritage institution. That's why the school always being renovate instead of reconstruction and keeping in mind to preserve its heritage outlook. Principal Anjali Gupta in an interview with Hindustan Times told "We are making efforts to renovate and repair the school, while preserving its heritage outlook. I will submit a detailed proposal to get heritage status." In 2015, it got the status of a "Heritage Model School", but it does not get any budgetary allocation for maintenance and preservation work.

Notable alumni and faculty members
 K. L. Saigal
 Ram Nath Shastri
 Balraj Puri
 Narsingh Dev Jamwal
 Anil Goswami
 Nirmal Chander Vij

References

High schools and secondary schools in Jammu and Kashmir
Schools in Jammu (city)
1872 establishments in India
Educational institutions established in 1872